"Rome-Old and Juli-Eh" is the fifteenth episode of the eighteenth season of the American animated television series The Simpsons. It originally aired on the Fox network in the United States on March 11, 2007. It was written by Daniel Chun, and directed by Nancy Kruse. Jane Kaczmarek guest starred as her recurring character, Judge Constance Harm.

Plot
Homer surprises the family with a newly decorated basement, now a recreation room with a pinball machine, a ping-pong table and other luxury items, prompting Marge to ask how Homer could afford all this. He says he has a plan and in the next scene files for bankruptcy before Constance Harm, believing that this will save him from paying his debts. Unfortunately, Harm tells him that the bankruptcy laws have changed and, under the new laws, he has to pay everything back. When looking through the family's expenses, Homer decides to save a lot of money by moving his father out of the retirement home and having him live with the family. The recreation room now doubles as Grampa's bedroom.

Homer and Marge go out one night and ask Grampa to babysit Bart and Lisa. Not entirely trusting Grampa's competence as a babysitter, Marge also asks her sister Selma Bouvier to come over and watch Grampa watch the kids. During the evening, Grampa and Selma end up kissing and eventually fall in love with each other, and are unaware that they are caught by Homer, much to his dismay, as he wants his dad to end up old and lonely. However, just as she was when Abe previously dated Selma's mother Jacqueline in "Lady Bouvier's Lover", Marge is happy with the arrangement, noting that Selma and Abe are like a yummy hot dog made from the parts of a pig no one wants. Patty is no happier than Homer and she enlists his help to break them up. Patty impersonates Selma and Homer dresses up as "Esteban de la Sexface", a Spanish lover-type, and the two arrange for Grampa to catch them kissing. Their plan is foiled though, when the actual Selma comes by and catches them. Angry at being manipulated, Grampa proposes to Selma and she accepts. They get married and move in together.

With Abe unable to find work, Selma is the sole breadwinner in the family, working hard in her new, more stressful job as department manager at the DMV. Abe, meanwhile, destroys their kitchen with his ignorance of how things work by misusing the appliances, causing a kitchen fire. This makes Selma realise that maybe love is not everything you need after all, and she dances with him one last time. They presumably divorce, with Grampa moving back to the retirement home and Selma moving back to her and Patty's room at Spinster Arms Apartments. Homer and Marge try roleplaying, with Homer as "Esteban de la Sexface" and the two pretending to be having an affair; when Marge says that her husband would be back soon, Homer plays along by jumping out of the window as "Esteban", then bursting into the bedroom as himself, trying to uncover the "adultery", much to Marge's annoyance.

Kicked out of the rec room, Bart and Lisa order a lot of complimentary shipping boxes from the A.S.S. ("American Shipping Services, not affiliated with the human ass"), getting the idea from Ned Flanders, and build a fort out of them. When the Wiseguy becomes angry and asks for them back, they refuse, whereupon he threatens to come back and get them by force (while using a cliche Lord of the Rings accent). Bart and Lisa think he is bluffing, but in fact, he comes back with an army of delivery men and women. Bart and Lisa put up a brave fight, first by releasing a barrage of cardboard tubes to trip the enemies, then using cardboard squares to throw like shuriken. The delivery men and women set up a siege ladder and Lisa wraps the lead man in tape and pushes the ladder down. They are aided by Nelson, who arrives unexpectedly to aid Lisa, saving her from a barrage of cardboard arrows. He dives down with twin cardboard tubes and fends off a large number of delivery men and women, while one of the enemies flies overhead, upon a giant, red Fell Beast.

The army swarms while Bart uses a cardboard tube to shoot down enemies with bricks, beehives, egg cartons and Snowball II. The A.S.S. legion fails and flees, but the kids immediately lose interest in their fort and melt it with the garden hose (ignoring the dead Fell beast nearby).

Cultural references

The title of this episode is a pun on Shakespeare's Romeo and Juliet.
The episode "Gump Roast", broadcast five seasons earlier, jokingly suggested that Patty and Selma and Grampa would marry in a future plotline during the ending song "They'll Never Stop The Simpsons", alongside other joke plotlines such as Marge becoming a robot.
To save gas, Homer says he is "Flintstoning" the car (cutting a hole in the floor so he can stick his legs through and push the car, as Fred Flintstone does, with the same sound effect but not the same efficiency). Homer also says "Yabba-Dabba-Do!".
"Is She Really Going Out with Him?" by Joe Jackson plays during Selma and Grampa in love sequence.
The battle sequence with Bart, Lisa, and the box salesmen uses The Fields of the Pelennor, a portion of the score from The Lord of the Rings: The Return of the King, and the scene itself is a parody of the Battle of the Hornburg from The Lord of the Rings: The Two Towers and the Battle of the Pelennor Fields also from The Lord of the Rings: The Return of the King. Lisa also references the movie when she says to Nelson "you've come to help us in our hour of need." One of the A.S.S. delivery men even flies a fell beast like the Nazgûl. Lisa also says "It begins" as the enemy attack begins, as King Théoden says "So it begins" before the Uruk-hai attack Helm's Deep.
Lisa calls the box fort Boxingham Palace, a reference to Buckingham Palace.
When Selma is admitting to Abe that their marriage will not work, she claims that The Beatles may not have been right, and that maybe, "love isn't all you need." This is a reference to the Beatles song, "All You Need Is Love".
Right before the battle Bart asks Lisa, "Who knew guys in brown shirts could cause so much trouble?" This is a reference to the brown shirts of the NSDAP's Sturmabteilung.

Reception
The episode drew 8.98 million viewers on its first broadcast on Fox.

Robert Canning of IGN gave the episode a 6 out of 10, concluding "Again, this was an episode that had a handful of funny bits, but none of it came together to tell a solid, original story. And that's one of the major downfalls that's been hurting the show of late -- running out of stories to tell. This isn't too surprising after 18 seasons, but you'd think they would have been able to come up with something better than another Selma marriage that you already knew was going to fail." Adam Finley of AOLTV wrote "This episode had some good laughs, but overall I wasn't too impressed".

References

External links

The Simpsons (season 18) episodes
2007 American television episodes